Wiesław Leszek Jędrusik (born 27 November 1945 in Dąbrowa Górnicza) is a Polish politician. He was elected to the Sejm on 25 September 2005, getting 9761 votes in 32 Sosnowiec district as a candidate from the Democratic Left Alliance list.

He was also a member of Sejm 2001-2005.

See also
Members of Polish Sejm 2005-2007

External links
Wiesław Jędrusik - parliamentary page - includes declarations of interest, voting record, and transcripts of speeches.

1945 births
Living people
People from Dąbrowa Górnicza
Members of the Polish Sejm 2005–2007
Members of the Polish Sejm 2001–2005
Democratic Left Alliance politicians